The Brandywine Heights Area School District is a small, rural public school district located in Berks County, Pennsylvania. It serves the Borough of Topton and District Township, Longswamp Township and Rockland Township in Berks County, Pennsylvania. According to 2010 federal census data, it serves a resident population of 12,876. In 2009, the district residents’ per capita income was $23,424, while the median family income was $58,993. In the Commonwealth, the median family income was $49,501 and the United States median family income was $49,445, in 2010.

The district operates: Brandywine Heights High School (9th–12th), Brandywine Heights Middle School (6th–8th), Brandywine Heights Intermediate School (4th–5th), and Brandywine Heights Elementary School (K–3rd).

References

School districts in Berks County, Pennsylvania